Fontenoy-le-Château is a commune in the Vosges department in Grand Est in northeastern France. In January 2013 it merged with the former commune of Le Magny.

Personalities
The poet Nicolas Joseph Florent Gilbert was born on December 15, 1750 in Fontenoy-le-Château.
Julie-Victoire Daubié (26 March 1824 in Bains-les-Bains – 26 August 1874 in Fontenoy-le-Château). She was the first woman to have graduated from a French university when she obtained a bachelor's degree in Lyon in 1861.
Rico Daniels who is Le Salvager, a TV programme made by Discovery Real Time, lives here and his TV show is filmed here.

Geography
The Côney forms the commune's north-eastern border, flows south-westward through the middle of the commune, crosses the village, and forms part of the commune's south-western border.

Points of interest
 Broderie de Fontenoy-le-Château
 Arboretum de Fontenoy-le-Château
 Château de Fontenoy-le-Château

See also
Communes of the Vosges department

http://www.felix-giese.de/EUSTORY/index.php

References

Communes of Vosges (department)